A surrogate is a substitute or deputy for another person in a specific role and may refer to:

Relationships 
 Surrogacy, an arrangement where a woman agrees to carry and give birth to a child for another person who will become its parent at birth
 Sexual surrogate, in sexual therapy
 Surrogate marriage, a custom in Zulu culture

Economics 
Ersatz, an artificial replacement differing in kind from and inferior in quality to what it replaces.
Surrogation, a psychological phenomenon in management science

Arts 
 Author surrogate or audience surrogate, reciprocal literary techniques
The Surrogates, a comic book series
Surrogates (film), a 2009 film based on the comic book series
The Surrogate (1984 film), a Canadian erotic film starring Art Hindle
The Surrogate (1995 film), a TV movie starring Alyssa Milano
The Surrogate (2020 film), an American LGBT-related Independent drama film
The Surrogate, original title of The Sessions, a 2012 film starring John Hawkes, Helen Hunt, and William H. Macy
 "Surro-Gate", an episode of the cartoon series American Dad!
 "The Surrogate" (The Outer Limits), an episode of the 1990s version of The Outer Limits series
 Surrogate Paintings, a series by American artist Allan McCollum

Science and technology 
 Surrogate model, used in engineering design
 Surrogate endpoint, a measure of effect in clinical trials
 Surrogate key, a unique database identification key
 Surrogate proxy, a type of server network setup
 Surrogate mechanism, which allows UTF-16 to represent Unicode code points beyond the Basic Multilingual Plane as a pair of surrogate code points
 Surrogate data testing, a technique for identifying possible nonlinearity in data.
 Surrogate, used in library science. Metadata is created to represent information resources.  The metadata serves as the surrogate for stored information resources.
 Surrogate species, used in ecology and conservation biology to indicate the following:
 Flagship species, chosen to support the marketing of a conservation effort
 Indicator species, which reveals the qualitative status of the environment
 Keystone species, which has a large effect on its environment
 Sentinel species, used to detect risks to humans by providing advance warning of a danger
 Umbrella species, whose protection indirectly protects many other species sharing its habitat

Other uses 
 Surrogate (clergy), a deputy of a bishop or ecclesiastical judge
 Surrogate Court, a court primarily concerned with the distribution of assets of a decedent
 Surrogate alcohol, a substance containing alcohol that is consumed, though it is not meant for human consumption